Abbey Road: 50th Anniversary Edition is an expanded reissue of the 1969 album Abbey Road by the English rock band the Beatles. It was released in September 2019 to coincide with the 50th anniversary of the original album. It includes a new stereo remix of the album by Giles Martin, the son of Beatles producer George Martin.

Background and content 

The box set was released on 27 September 2019. Presented with new mixes in stereo, 5.1 surround, and Dolby Atmos, expanded with previously unreleased session recordings and demos, the anniversary releases include a four-disc set, three-LP vinyl set, a two-CD set, a limited-edition picture disc, single CD and LP releases, and digital and streaming. On 26 September 2019, the Beatles YouTube channel premiered a music video for "Here Comes the Sun" in its 2019 remix to promote the 50th anniversary of the album and the anniversary edition.

On Metacritic, the deluxe version receives an aggregate score of 99/100, based on 10 reviews – which the website defines as indicating "universal acclaim".

Track listings

New stereo mix of original album

Super Deluxe edition tracks

Personnel 

 Giles Martin – producer
Sam Okell – mix engineer
Miles Showell – stereo mastering engineer
Matthew Cocker – transfer engineer
Stefano Civetta – mix assistant
Simon Gibson – audio restoration
Adam Sharp – project management

Charts 
2019 reissue

References 

2019 compilation albums
The Beatles compilation albums
Albums produced by George Martin
Reissue albums